The Brier, known as the Tim Hortons Brier for sponsorship reasons, is the annual Canadian men's curling championship, sanctioned by Curling Canada. The current event name refers to its main sponsor, the Tim Hortons coffee and donut shop chain. "Brier" originally referred to a brand of tobacco sold by the event's first sponsor, the Macdonald Tobacco Company.

The Brier has been held since 1927, traditionally during the month of March. The winner of the Brier goes on to represent Canada at the World Curling Championships of the same year. The Brier is by far the best supported curling competition in terms of paid attendance, attracting crowds far larger than even those for World Championships held in Canada.

History
In 1924, George J. Cameron, the president of the W. L. Mackenzie and Company subsidiary of the Macdonald Tobacco Company, pitched the idea of a national curling championship to Macdonald Tobacco and was accepted. At the time Canadian curling was divided between the use of granite and iron curling stones, with the latter being used in Quebec and Eastern Ontario and the former being used everywhere else. The granite camp held the advantage, as Macdonald Tobacco's T. Howard Stewart, brother of company president Walter Stewart, supported the use of granites, and was able to influence the decision to use granite stones for the new national championship.

Macdonald Tobacco further developed the concept, in 1925 and 1926, by sponsoring the winners of the "Macdonald Brier Trophy" at the MCA Bonspiel to travel to Eastern Canada. In 1925, the Manitoba team played a number of exhibition games against local teams, while the 1926 team played in the Quebec Bonspiel. The visits were deemed popular enough for Macdonald Tobacco to move forward with sponsorship of a full national championship in 1927.

The first Brier was held at the Granite Club in Toronto in 1927. Eight teams from across the country participated, representing Western Canada, Ontario, Quebec, New Brunswick, Nova Scotia, Northern Ontario, Toronto and Montreal. Games lasted 14 ends, and each team played each other in a 7-game round robin with no playoffs unless there was a tie for first. The first Brier champion was Nova Scotia, a rink skipped by Murray Macneill, with teammates Al MacInnes, Cliff Torey and Jim Donahue – who were normally skips in their own right, but were added to the Macneill rink because the rest of his normal team could not make the trip.

By 1928, games were shortened to 12 ends in length and the single Western Canada team was replaced by individual teams from Alberta, Saskatchewan and Manitoba, increasing the total number of teams to 10 – seven provinces, two cities and the region of Northern Ontario. In the 1932 Brier, the cities of Montreal and Toronto were dropped from competition, but Northern Ontario kept its entry, and still remains the only non provincial or territorial entry to this day. In 1936, Prince Edward Island and British Columbia were given entries. The Dominion of Newfoundland did not become part of Canada until after the 1949 Brier, so the team representing the new province of Newfoundland (later Newfoundland and Labrador) did not join the Brier until 1951. In 1975, a single combined team representing the federal territories of Yukon and Northwest Territories joined the Brier competition. In 1977, games were shortened to 10 ends, which is the current length for matches. Games had to be played in their entirety until the 1974 Brier, when the rules were changed to the present standard of allowing a team to concede defeat before the end of the match if they wished.

The Brier would continue to be played at the Granite Club in Toronto through to the 1940 competition. After then, the event would travel around the country, and would be played in all 10 provinces. Also at this point, rocks were coloured differently for each team and were matched to be of equal size. Play was discontinued between 1943 and 1945 due to World War II. After World War II, the event became more of a popular sporting spectacle across the country thanks to Macdonald Tobacco enlisting media outlets to cover the event. In 1946, the Canadian Broadcasting Corporation (CBC) began covering the event live across the country on the radio. By the 1960s, the CBC began showing curling on television, at first giving daily half-hour reports. In 1962, the CBC showed the tie-breaking playoff match up. In 1973, CBC began regularly showing live coverage of the final draw of the event. Today, TSN covers the entire tournament. CBC had covered the semi-finals and the finals up until the 2007–08 season. In 2013, Sportsnet and City began to offer coverage of the finals of the provincial playdowns in Manitoba, Ontario, Alberta, and British Columbia as well.

In 1977, Macdonald Tobacco announced it would no longer be sponsoring the Brier, and the 1979 event would be the last one titled the Macdonald Brier. A committee headed by the Canadian Curling Association (today's Curling Canada) was put in charge to find a new sponsor, which would end up being the Labatt Brewing Company. The event retained the "Brier" name, despite the word being the property of Macdonald Tobacco. However, with the Labatt sponsorship came some changes to the event, such as adding a new championship trophy and adding a TV-friendly playoff round after the round robin games. Labatt remained the title sponsor until 2001 when Nokia took over. That sponsorship only lasted four years before Tim Hortons took over, until 2024. When the Labatt sponsorship ended, the original Brier trophy was brought back and the names of the winners during the Labatt era were engraved on it.

Beginning in the 1990s, curling became more profitable, and the event would mostly be held in larger curling friendly markets (such as Edmonton, Calgary, Winnipeg and Saskatoon). At the same time, the World Curling Tour made the sport more lucrative, and curlers demanded cash prizes at the Brier, and the ability to display their sponsors on their jerseys. The Canadian Curling Association ignored their demands, and when the Grand Slam curling series was instituted in 2001, many of the top teams in the country boycotted the Brier in favour of playing in the Slams. Curlers' demands were eventually met and the boycott ended in 2003. The dominant Brier team of the era, the "Ferbey four" did not boycott the Brier, and won four of five Briers during the era, while other top teams such as Kevin Martin's boycotted the event.

Sponsors
For the first fifty years, the Brier was sponsored by Macdonald Tobacco (later RJR Tobacco Company and now part of JTI-Macdonald Corporation).  The name "Brier", in fact, came from a brand of tobacco being manufactured by Macdonald at the time (a brier being a small shrub whose roots are commonly used to make tobacco pipes).  Macdonald was also responsible for introducing both the Brier Tankard trophy (originally named the British Consols Trophy after a brand of cigarettes), and the now famous heart-shaped patches awarded to the tournament winners. The patches were modeled after a small tin heart pressed into the centre of Macdonald tobacco plugs, along with the slogan “The Heart of the Tobacco.” The same heart appeared on tins of Macdonald pipe tobacco. Later, when other national championships were developed, many took the heart as their identifying symbol as well.

Qualification and eligibility

The Brier is currently contested by 18 teams. Most provinces and territories are represented by one team, with the exception of Ontario, which sends two teams (named Ontario and Northern Ontario).  Through 2014 the territories sent one team, but starting in 2015 all three territories were permitted to compete individually. Teams qualify for the Brier through their respective provincial championships, which are held every year and are open to any Canadian men's curling team consisting of Canadian citizens. The formats for these championships vary from province to province, but most entail a series of club, municipal, district and/or regional playdowns prior to the provincial championship. Playdown formats vary, with each member association choosing a format suited to its geography and demographics. Originally, nearly all teams regardless of ability or past performance had to qualify for each Brier, starting at the club level when more than one team from a club seeks to enter the playdowns. Today, member associations typically grant past champions and other strong teams automatic entry to the latter stage(s) of the playdowns.

Until 2013, the champions of the Brier did not automatically qualify for the following year's Brier, and had to qualify again. However, beginning in 2014, following the precedent set by its women's counterpart, the Scotties Tournament of Hearts, champions now earn a bye representing Canada during the following year's Brier.

For the three tournaments from 2015 to 2017, fifteen teams (ten provinces, three territories, Northern Ontario, and Team Canada) competed for twelve places in the Brier proper. The four lowest-ranked regions played a pre-qualifying tournament to open the Brier, with the winner advancing to the full round-robin. In this format's first year Nunavut declined to send a team, and the round was between the winners of Prince Edward Island, Nova Scotia, and the Yukon.

Beginning with the 2018 Brier, the event expanded to a sixteen team field, with the ten provinces, three territories, Northern Ontario, and Team Canada being joined by the highest-ranked non-qualified team on the Canadian Team Ranking System standings. The teams are separated into two pools of eight, each playing a round-robin, with the top four teams in each pool advancing to a second pool to determine the final four teams.

Winners

Macdonald Brier

Labatt Brier

Nokia Brier

Tim Hortons Brier

Top 3 finishes table
As of the 2023 Brier

Prior to the 2011 Brier, there were no bronze medal games, so the third-place finishes listed in the table are for the teams that finished third in the tournament. Following the introduction of bronze medal games, which were played between the loser of the 3 versus 4 page playoff game and the loser of the semifinal game, the third-place finishes listed are for the teams that won the bronze medal games in each Brier. The bronze medal games were discontinued with the 2018 Brier.

Awards

Hec Gervais Playoff MVP Award

Ross Harstone Sportsmanship Award

Shot of the Week Award

Ford Hot Shots

Records

Most Brier wins as skip
Only one skip, Brad Gushue, has won the Brier five times (2017, 2018, 2020, 2022, 2023).

Four people have won the Brier four times as skip:
 Ernie Richardson (1959, 1960, 1962, 1963)
 Kevin Martin (1991, 1997, 2008, 2009)
 Randy Ferbey (2001, 2002, 2003, 2005) 
 Kevin Koe (2010, 2014, 2016, 2019)

Top Attendance Records

Perfect games
A perfect game in curling is one in which a player scores 100% on all their shots in a game. Statistics on shots have been kept since 1980 (except for 1982).

Number of games played
As of the 2023 Brier

Most Brier game wins as skip

On March 5, 2018 Brad Gushue skipped the 114th win of his Brier career, breaking a three-way tie with previous record-holders Russ Howard and Kevin Martin. His first victory took place on March 1, 2003, 15 years earlier.

See also
Scottish Men's Curling Championship
United States Men's Curling Championship
World Curling Championships
Scotties Tournament of Hearts (Canada)
Scottish Women's Curling Championship

Notes

References

Further reading
Shot Stone: Curling in Canada at Library and Archives Canada
SOUDOG'S Curling History Site

External links

 Curling Canada
 Brier news at CurlingRink.ca
 Archives

Brier
 
Tim Hortons
1927 establishments in Canada
Recurring sporting events established in 1927